Pingasa chlora, the white looper moth or flower-eating caterpillar, is a species of moth of the family Geometridae first described by Caspar Stoll in 1782. It is found Sundaland, the Philippines, Sulawesi and from the Moluccas to Queensland, Australia.

Larvae have been reared on leaves of Euroschinus and from Flindersia species. It is considered a pest on Nephelium lappaceum and Litchi chinensis in Australia. Other recorded food plants include Euroschinus falcata, Rhodomyrtus tomentosa and Flindersia schottiana.

Subspecies
Pingasa chlora chlora (Stoll, 1782)
Pingasa chlora candidaria Warren, 1894
Pingasa chlora subdentata Warren, 1894
Pingasa chlora sublimbata (Butler, 1882)

References

External links

Moths described in 1782
Pseudoterpnini